The Men's Javelin throw event at the 2011 World Championships in Athletics was held at the Daegu Stadium on September 1 & 3.

Preliminary leader Guillermo Martínez made his best throw in the first round, followed shortly by Matthias de Zordo's 86.27 winner.  Meanwhile favorite world leader Andreas Thorkildsen languished in as low as eighth place, barely the last qualifier for his remaining three throws.  All of the competitors had previously thrown far enough to displace Thorkildsen in the preliminary round.  On his fourth throw he finally put one good throw together to leapfrog into the silver medal position.  de Zordo was ranked fourth and Martínez had only been ranked twelfth on the annual list prior to the competition.

Medalists

Records
Prior to the competition, the records were as follows:

Qualification standards

Schedule
All times local.

Results

Qualification
Qualification: Qualifying Performance 82.50 (Q) or at least 12 best performers (q) advance to the final

Final

References

External links
Javelin throw results at IAAF website

Javelin throw
Javelin throw at the World Athletics Championships